Sabrina Richard (also written as Sabryna Richard, born 1 January 1977) is a French female weightlifter, competing in the 48 kg category and representing France at international competitions. She competed at the 2000 Summer Olympics in Sydney, Australia, finishing in 8th place in the women's flyweight division (– 48 kg). She competed at world championships, most recently at the 2003 World Weightlifting Championships.

Major results

References

1977 births
Living people
French female weightlifters
Place of birth missing (living people)
Weightlifters at the 2000 Summer Olympics
Olympic weightlifters of France
Mediterranean Games silver medalists for France
Mediterranean Games medalists in weightlifting
Competitors at the 2001 Mediterranean Games